Phosphatrioxa-adamantane is an organophosphorus compound that is used as a precursor to bulky phosphine ligands. Abbreviated CgPH (for cage phosphine), it is a white solid. 

The compound is prepared by the condensation of two equivalents of acetylacetone and phosphine:
PH3  +  2 CH3C(O)CH2C(O)CH3   →   HP(CH3CCH2CCH3)2O3  +  H2O
The condensation is sometimes called the Buckler–Epstein reaction.  Many diketones can be employed in place of acetylacetone.  The P-H bond can be further derivatized, leading to a range of tertiary phosphines of potential value in homogeneous catalysis.

References

Phosphines